Southwest Airlines Co. v. Saxon, 596 U.S. ___ (2022), was a United States Supreme Court case related to the scope of the Federal Arbitration Act, in which the Court unanimously held that cargo loaders and ramp supervisors employed at airports are exempt from the Federal Arbitration Act.

Background 

Section 1 of the Federal Arbitration Act, exempts "contracts of employment of seamen, railroad employees, or any other class of workers engaged in foreign or interstate commerce" from its scope. In its 2001 Circuit City Stores, Inc. v. Adams decision, the Supreme Court of the United States held the residual clause of Section 1 applies only to "transportation workers."

Latrice Saxon was a ramp supervisor for Southwest Airlines who directed the loading and unloading of cargo from the airline's flights. Saxon filed a lawsuit under the Fair Labor Standards Act of 1938 disputing Southwest's handling of overtime pay for ramp supervisors. The airline invoked an arbitration clause in Saxon's employment contract, and the district court dismissed her suit on that basis, finding that the Federal Arbitration Act did apply to her contract. The United States Court of Appeals for the Seventh Circuit reversed, holding Saxon was a transportation worker and her job involved her working in interstate commerce. Southwest filed a petition for a writ of certiorari.

Supreme Court 

Due to the ruling in the Seventh Circuit contradicting another similar ruling in the United States Court of Appeal for the fifth circuit. Certiorari was granted in the case on December 10, 2021. Oral arguments were held on March 28, 2022. On June 6, 2022, the Supreme Court affirmed the Seventh Circuit in an unanimous decision.

References

External links 
 

2022 in United States case law
United States Supreme Court cases
United States Supreme Court cases of the Roberts Court
United States arbitration case law
United States class action case law
United States labor case law